Kazi Khaleda Khatun was one of the school students who took part in the Bengali Language Movement  at a young age.

Birth
On 7 August 1939, Khaleda Khatun was born in the 'Kazi' family of Pirojpur, Barishal, Bangladesh. Her father was Kazi Majhar Uddin Ahmed and her mother Hakimunnesa Khatun. Her elder brother is a martyr of the Bangladesh Liberation War.

Education
Kazi Khaleda Khatun finished her matriculation from Kamrunnessa Government Girls High School in 1954. After finishing her Intermatriculation from Eden Women College in 1956, she achieved MBBS degree from Dhaka Medical College in 1968.

Career
She started her career as a lecturer of pathology department in Dhaka Medical College. Later she was a curator of that department. She started working in Iraq under the Iraq government for four years from 1978. In 1983, she returned Dhaka and joined Dhaka Medical College again. She had also worked in the National Heart disease Institute in Dhaka.

Participation in the Language Movement
Khaleda Khatun was a student of the 8th grade during the Language Movement time, in 1952. She was motivated by other language movement activists and took part in this movement actively. In February 1952, she ignored the 144 rule like other language movement activists and attended the meeting at 'Amtola' of University of Dhaka. She also took part at the rally breaking the 144 rule and was tortured by the police. She fell sick due to the tear gas police used at that rally.

First Martyr Monument in School
Kazi Khaleda Khatun along with other female language activists built up a Martyr Monument known as "Shaheed Minar" in Kamrunnesa Govt. Girls School. It was a replica of Shaheed Minar, Dhaka. It was also first monument built up on the memory of language martyrs in any school.

Death
This language activist died on 28 September 2013. She was buried in Mirpur Buddhijibi Cemetery.

References

External links
 Dr. Kazi Khaleda Khatun

1939 births
2013 deaths
People from Pirojpur District
Bengali activists
Bengali language movement activists
Academic staff of Dhaka Medical College and Hospital
Eden Mohila College alumni